The Macau Ice Sports Federation is the governing body of ice hockey in Macau.

External links
Macau at IIHF.com
Macau Ice Sports Federation Official Website

Ice hockey governing bodies in Asia
International Ice Hockey Federation members